Barney Jenkins was a Negro league catcher in the 1920s.

Jenkins made his Negro leagues debut in 1929 with the Detroit Stars. In his only recorded game with the club, Jenkins managed a hit and an RBI in four plate appearances.

References

External links
 and Seamheads

Place of birth missing
Place of death missing
Year of birth missing
Year of death missing
Detroit Stars players
Baseball catchers